Larry L. Campbell (born July 31, 1931) is a Republican politician from the U.S. state of Oregon. He served as Speaker of the Oregon House of Representatives in the early 1990s, representing Eugene.

Early years
Larry Campbell began his career in the army and was honorably discharged as a Sergeant First Class. Campbell served as the Republican leader from 1982 to 1990. Campbell is credited with engineering his party's 1990 takeover of the state legislature, which lasted 16 years.

Lobbying career
He began working as a lobbyist in 1995, immediately after the end of his legislative term. He was criticized for pre-filing a bill that benefited a client, with whom he had signed a contract while still a legislator.

In 1999, he was considered the most powerful man in Salem. He started the Oregon Victory PAC, which quickly became the biggest lobbying group in the state outside the major parties; it contributed over $750,000 to Oregon politicians in the 1990s. He drew criticism for campaigning on behalf of Republican control of the legislature during the 2007 legislative session.

References 

Speakers of the Oregon House of Representatives
Republican Party members of the Oregon House of Representatives
Living people
1931 births